Jeffrey George Ruland (born December 16, 1958) is an American former professional basketball player and coach. He is the former head coach of the Iona Gaels men's basketball team and the UDC Firebirds men's college basketball team.

Early life and collegiate career

A , 280 lb center, Ruland went from Sachem High School in Suffolk County, New York, to Iona College on a basketball scholarship and played for coach Jim Valvano before Valvano left for North Carolina State University. Ruland played on the Gaels' 1979–1980 team that beat eventual national champion Louisville, 77–60, at Madison Square Garden during the regular season and compiled a 29–5 record en route to a number 19 national ranking, the best in the school's history. However, Ruland was found in violation of NCAA rules by hiring an agent, Paul Corvino, at International Management Inc. and was ruled ineligible to play his senior year at Iona.

Professional career

Ruland was selected by the Golden State Warriors in the 1980 NBA draft with the 25th overall pick. During the 1980–81 NBA season he instead opted to play professionally in Barcelona, Spain for a year before returning to the U.S. Before his rookie campaign, his draft rights were traded by the Warriors to the Washington Bullets, with whom he played for five seasons before being traded to the Philadelphia 76ers. He retired after five games with them in 1987 after a nagging knee injury.

Washington Bullets  (1981-1986)
Joining the Bullets for the 1981–82 NBA season, Ruland played behind 32-year-old Spencer Haywood but had greater per-game averages than him during the same number of minutes. Seeing time at both forward and center, Ruland showed muscle at both ends of the floor and an accurate jump shot good from as far as 20 feet. A 56% shooter from the floor, Ruland registered as having the 10th-best field goal percentage in the league. That postseason, the Bullets swept the New Jersey Nets, before losing to the Boston Celtics in the Eastern Conference Semifinals. Ruland's playoff averages were 17 points and 9.4 rebounds per game off the bench.

Ruland took over the starting power forward spot for the 1982–83 NBA season, and continued to back up at center for Washington. His 55% shooting and 11 rebounds per game ranked him, respectively, 10th and 8th place league-wide. Leading coach Gene Shue's balanced team in scoring as well, Ruland earned a spot in the NBA All-Star Game that year. Despite finishing with the same record as the year before, the Bullets did not make the playoffs.

In the 1983–84 season, Ruland’s averages surged to 22 points and four assists per game. On November 25 of that season, Ruland scored a career-high 38 points, and also grabbed 16 rebounds, in a win over the Detroit Pistons. By the end of the season, Ruland was third in the NBA in total rebounds and fifth in shooting percentage from the floor. The Bullets returned to the playoffs and again lost to Boston. In the series, Ruland averaged 24 points, 13 rebounds, 8 assists, 52% from the floor and 81% from the foul line against the eventual NBA champions.

For the 1984–85 NBA season, Ruland was moved to the center for the Bullets. His stats dipped slightly. He remained among the rebounding and shooting leaders, but suffered a broken bone in his foot and played just 37 games. Ruland played through the pain in the playoffs, but the Bullets lost to the Philadelphia 76ers to end a disappointing season.

The brittle feet, though, like Bill Walton before him, were now a condition. He played 30 games during the 1985–86 NBA season, usually in considerable pain. In the playoffs, the Bullets opted to start towering Manute Bol at the center. Ruland added 14 points and five assists per game off the bench, but the Bullets fell to Philadelphia for the second consecutive season.

Philadelphia 76ers (1986-1987)

Traded to Philadelphia for Moses Malone the following season, Ruland played in five games before getting injured and subsequently retiring.

Second stint with 76ers (1992) 
Five years later Ruland made a comeback with the Sixers, playing in 13 games during the 1991–92 NBA season before sustaining an Achilles injury involving a luggage cart which was allegedly slammed into his leg by a Boston Celtics employee outside Boston Garden.

Detroit Pistons (1992-1993) 
He managed to play an additional 11 games with the Detroit Pistons the following season before retiring for good in January 1993.

Coaching career

After his playing days, Ruland became an assistant coach under the Sixers' Fred Carter during the 1993–94 NBA season. He then returned to coach at his alma mater. He was fired from Iona on March 21, 2007, after a 2–28 record for the 2006–2007 season.  Yet during his tenure as head coach, he guided the Gaels to three 20-win seasons, three MAAC Championships and three NCAA Tournament appearances.  Recruiting and injuries were blamed for the team's abysmal record during his final season. A factor for the 2–28 season was that the administration fired Ruland's assistant coaches. Ruland could not recruit for that season. Ruland's termination as a head coach came from Iona College president James Liguori while he was on a cruise.

On July 16, 2007, Ruland was hired to replace Michael Cooper as the head coach of the NBA D-League's Albuquerque Thunderbirds. After coaching the Thunderbirds for the 2007–08 season, Ruland was hired as an assistant coach for the Philadelphia 76ers on August 23, 2008. New 76ers head Coach Eddie Jordan decided not to retain Ruland for the 2009–10 season.

On August 18, 2009, Ruland announced that he would be the new men's basketball head coach at the University of the District of Columbia. After a late September hiring and the first season with only one win, his third year saw a 22-win season. He was fired in 2013.

In 2015, Ruland was hired as an advance scout for the Washington Wizards. Despite his record, he has never coached another NCAA team.

Head coaching record

References

External links
 

1958 births
Living people
All-American college men's basketball players
American expatriate basketball people in Spain
American men's basketball coaches
American men's basketball players
Basketball coaches from New York (state)
Basketball players from New York (state)
Centers (basketball)
Detroit Pistons players
FC Barcelona Bàsquet players
Golden State Warriors draft picks
Iona Gaels men's basketball coaches
Iona Gaels men's basketball players
McDonald's High School All-Americans
National Basketball Association All-Stars
Parade High School All-Americans (boys' basketball)
People from Bay Shore, New York
People from Lake Ronkonkoma, New York
Philadelphia 76ers players
Power forwards (basketball)
Sportspeople from Suffolk County, New York
UDC Firebirds men's basketball coaches
Washington Bullets players